Burgmüller may refer to:
 Friedrich August Burgmüller, a German pianist and conductor; his sons:
 Friedrich Burgmüller, a German pianist and composer
 Norbert Burgmüller, a German composer, the younger brother of the above one